Romanaria spasmaria is a species of moth of the family Tortricidae. It is found in Morona-Santiago Province, Ecuador.

The wingspan is 17 mm. The ground colour of the forewings is cream white, suffused with greyish and dotted with black. The hindwings are white cream in the basal area and more brownish grey sprinkled with grey brown in the remaining area.

Etymology
The species name refers to the refracted black band on the forewings and is derived from Greek spasma (meaning broken piece).

References

Moths described in 2006
Euliini
Taxa named by Józef Razowski
Moths of South America